Robert Doucet (born ) is a Canadian male weightlifter, competing in the 85 kg category and representing Canada at international competitions. He competed at world championships, most recently at the 1998 World Weightlifting Championships.

Major results

References

1975 births
Living people
Canadian male weightlifters
Place of birth missing (living people)
20th-century Canadian people
21st-century Canadian people